Syed Arif Hussain (born 25 April 1989) is a Pakistani footballer who last played for WAPDA in the 2014–15 Pakistan Premier League, and was released from the team at the start of 2018–19 season.

Hussain made his international debut against India during 2012 AFC Challenge Cup qualifications. His last appearance for national side was against Bangladesh in 2014 FIFA World Cup qualifications.

References

Pakistani footballers
Pakistan international footballers
1989 births
Living people

Association football midfielders